Titus Ollius (died AD 31) was a prominent Roman citizen and the father of Poppaea Sabina, the Empress consort of the Roman Empire. His origins lay in Cupra Maritima, a town of Picenum; an inscription found there bears his name and that of three of his freedmen. Ollius was implicated in Sejanus' conspiracy against Tiberius, and committed suicide.

Ancestry
Titus was Nero's father-in-law (#6 below).

Notes

Further reading
 (edd.), Prosopographia Imperii Romani saeculi I, II et III, Berlin, 1933 – . (PIR2)

1st-century Romans
Family of Nero
31 deaths
Ancient Romans who committed suicide
Poppaea Sabina
Ollii